Velleppam is an upcoming Indian Malayalam language movie directed by debutant Praveen Raj Pookkadan. It has Jins Thomas and Dwarak Udayashankar as producers with Lingson and Anit as co-producers, and stars Roma Asrani, Shine Tom Chacko, Akshay Radakrishnan, Noorin Shereef, Sreejith Ravi and Kailash in major roles.

Pramod Pappan are the executive producers of the film with music by S.P.Venkatesh. The principal photography of the film started on 17 November 2019 at Thrissur.

Summary
Velleppam revolves around the life of Sara, who is a Velleppam seller at Velleppangadi, a market of the " Velleppam". Sara's irresponsible brother Josemon falls in Love with Kaleena, which takes Josemon's and Sara's life into more serious troubles. Sakhavu, a comrade of the ruling party is the only helping hand for Sara and Josemon, but they never knew they are up against tough and cunning opponents.

Cast
 

 Roma Asrani as Sara
 Shine Tom Chacko as Sakhavu
 Akshay Radakrishnan as Josemon
 Noorin Shereef as Kaleena Sebastian
 Sreejith Ravi as Tony 
 Kailash as Ousep
 Sohan Seenulal as Peethamabaran
 Sunil Abdul Kareem as George Luca
 Vaishakh C V as Justin 
 Fahim Safar as Sibin
 Sanif as Bengali 
 Kshama Saran as Mariyamma 
 Bhadra Venkatesh as Sharada 
 Aleena as Blousy CP
 Philip Thukalan as Bible Vasu
 Suma as Bengali Girl
 Vinod Mala as Vareeth 
 RJ Vijay as Wilfred

Production

As per the director, the film " uses both reality and fantasy elements to say the story, like in movies such as Amen". Actress Roma Asrani was signed as the lead actress with actors Shine Tom Chacko and Akshay Radakrishnan were signed for other roles. Veteran music director S.P.Venkatesh composes songs and background score  whereas Munna Panicker is the project designer  of the film.Noorin Shereef was added to the cast later and she plays an artist who comes to Thrissur to retouch mural paintings of Puthanpally that were damaged during floods. The director and the lead stars followed a unique marketing after the first look poster launch by making and presenting Appams to the guests.

References

External links
 
 

Upcoming films
Upcoming Malayalam-language films
Indian romantic comedy films
Upcoming directorial debut films
Films shot in Thrissur